François Duchesne (1616–1693) was a French historian.

Biography
François Duchesne, the son of the historian André Duchesne, was born in Paris in 1616. He "cultivated history with a zeal" and obtained the title of historiographer. He died in 1693.

Works
Duchesne wrote:
History of the Chancellors of France (1680)

Duchesne published several editions of his father's works including:
Antiquies of the Cities and Castles of France (1647),
The History of the Poses (1653).

Notes

References 

1616 births
1693 deaths